Robert Ancelin (22 November 1898 - 25 January 1986) was a French actor and theater director. He was married with the soprano Fanély Revoil from 1937 to 1942 and directing manager of the Théâtre de la Porte-Saint-Martin from 1940 to 1949.

Filmography 
 1930 : Hai-Tang by Richard Eichberg and Jean Kemm as Boris Ivanoff
 1931 : Y'en a pas deux comme Angélique by Roger Lion as Jean Larivière
 1931 : About an Inquest by Robert Siodmak and Henri Chomette as Klate
 1932 : Y'a erreur by Joseph Tzipine (short film)
 1932 : Love and Luck by Monty Banks as Jackson
 1932 : Clochard by Robert Péguy as Poum
 1932 : The Last Blow by Jacques de Baroncelli as Lucien
 1933 : La Poule by René Guissart as Paul Cellier
 1933 : Prince des Six Jours by Robert Vernay as Teddy, the barman
 1933 : Vilaine histoire by Christian-Jaque (short film) as the amateur detective
 1933 : L'Empreinte sanglante by Jean Mamy (short film) as the amateur detective
 1933 : Deux blondes by Jean Mamy (short film) as the amateur detective
 1933 : Le Client du numéro 16 by Jean Mamy (short film)
 1933 : Ce n'est pas lui, anonymous direction (short film)
 1933 : L'Atroce Menace by Christian-Jaque (short film) as the amateur detective
 1934 : Crime d'amour by Roger Capellani (short film)
 1934 : Lui...ou...elle by Roger Capellani (court métrage) as the amateur detective
 1935 : Sans elle by M. Deleric (short film)
 1935 : La Bandera by Julien Duvivier as the lieutenant
 1938 : Café de Paris by Yves Mirande and Georges Lacombe
 1939 : La Loi du Nord by Jacques Feyder

Theatre 
Comedian
 1930: Arsène Lupin banquier, operetta, libretto Yves Mirande, couplets Albert Willemetz, composer Marcel Lattes after Maurice Leblanc, Théâtre des Bouffes-Parisiens
 1942: Occupe-toi d'Amélie by Georges Feydeau, directed by Robert Ancelin, Théâtre de la Porte-Saint-Martin
 1943: Pour avoir Adrienne by Louis Verneuil, directed by Robert Ancelin, Théâtre de la Porte-Saint-Martin

Theatre director
 1940: Le Bossu by Paul Féval and Auguste Anicet-Bourgeois, Théâtre de la Porte-Saint-Martin
 1941: Le Maître de forges by Georges Ohnet, Théâtre de la Porte-Saint-Martin
 1941: The Two Orphans by Adolphe d'Ennery and Eugène Cormon, Théâtre de la Porte-Saint-Martin
 1941: Mon curé chez les riches by Clément Vautel, Théâtre de la Porte-Saint-Martin 
 1941: La Porteuse de pain by Xavier de Montépin, Théâtre de la Porte-Saint-Martin
 1941: Le Contrôleur des wagons-lits and Les Surprises du divorce by Alexandre Bisson, Théâtre de la Porte-Saint-Martin
 1941: Les Deux Gosses by Pierre Decourcelle, Théâtre de la Porte-Saint-Martin
 1942: La Bouquetière des Innocents by Auguste Anicet-Bourgeois and Ferdinand Dugué, Théâtre de la Porte-Saint-Martin
 1942: Occupe-toi d'Amélie! by Georges Feydeau, Théâtre de la Porte-Saint-Martin
 1942: Et moi je te dis qu'elle t'a fait de l'œil by Maurice Hennequin and Pierre Veber, Théâtre de la Porte-Saint-Martin
 1943: Pour avoir Adrienne by Louis Verneuil, Théâtre de la Porte-Saint-Martin 
 1943: Mon oncle et mon curé by Jean de La Brète, Théâtre de la Porte-Saint-Martin
 1943: Le Pavillon d'Asnières by Charles Méré after Georges Simenon, Théâtre de la Porte-Saint-Martin
 1943: Mon curé chez les riches after the novel by Clément Vautel, Théâtre de la Porte-Saint-Martin
 1945: A Flea in Her Ear by Georges Feydeau, Théâtre de la Porte-Saint-Martin
 1948: Un p'tit mari en or by André Mouëzy-Éon, Théâtre de la Porte-Saint-Martin

External links 
 
 Films liés à Robert Ancelin sur CinéRessources.net
 Robert Ancelin sur lesArchivesduSpectacle.net
 Robert Ancelin sur La Comédie musicale en France

French male film actors
French male stage actors 
Theatre directors from Paris
People from Poitiers
1898 births
1986 deaths